The Spanish Baccalaureate is the post-16 stage of education in Spain, comparable to the A Levels/Higher (Scottish) in the UK, the French Baccalaureate in France or the International Baccalaureate. It follows the ESO (compulsory stage of secondary education). After taking the Bachillerato, a student may enter vocational training (Higher-level Training Cycles, Ciclos Formativos de Grado Superior) or take the "Selectividad" tests for admission to university.

There are two parts, a core curriculum with the compulsory subjects and a specialist part with a number of pre-selected branches to choose from.

History
In Spanish (and Hispano-American) education from the 13th century up to the 17th or 18th century, the term Bachiller referred to the lower grade of university studies, enabling entry to a profession without reaching the higher grades of licenciado or doctorado.

Before 1953 in Spain, the term bachillerato covered all of secondary education, which was taken after passing an entrance examination by those students expected to go to university. It consisted of seven yearly stages, normally taken between the ages of 10 and 17. On completion, students took a State Examination (Examen de Estado). From 1949 there was also a vocational or technical version (Bachillerato Laboral).

In 1953 the bachillerato was divided into two parts: Bachillerato Elemental (elementary) and Bachillerato Superior (higher). The first was taken over four years, at ages 10–14, and the second over two years at 15 and 16; each stage terminated with a final examination (Reválida). Students who had remained in primary education up to the age of 14, on passing the first-stage Reválida, could still enter the Bachillerato Superior, in which there were two branches: Sciences and Arts. Following this, students could take a one-year stage of pre-university studies (Preuniversitario, or "Preu" for short).

Reforms during the 1970s absorbed the Bachillerato Elemental into the upper stages of the basic education system for 6- to 14-year-olds, and replaced the Bachillerato Superior with a three-year Bachillerato Unificado Polivalente (BUP). At the age of 14 a student could now opt to enter the BUP without having to pass a specific test, or could go into vocational training. The "Preu" was replaced by a Curso de Orientación Universitaria (COU).

The introduction under "LOGSE" of compulsory secondary education up to age 16 (Educación Secundaria Obligatoria, ESO) took place during the 1990s. The Bachillerato now became a two-year course following the completion of compulsory education, with middle-grade vocational training as an alternative. It had five branches: Arts, Technology, Social Sciences, Health Sciences, and Humanities. Further reforms were made under the "LOE" of 2006, and under the "LOMCE" of 2013.

Present
As established under LOE (the Spanish Educational Law) of 2006, the Baccalaureate is studied over two years, usually upon the completion of compulsory secondary education (ESO). Following the enactment of LOMCE, there are three distinct branches: Arts (two paths), Sciences and Technology, and Humanities and Social Sciences, with two "itineraries" for the Humanities and Social Sciences branch.

As in the compulsory primary and secondary stages of education, in the Baccalaureate there is a distinction between "core subjects", "specialist subjects" and "subjects chosen by the Autonomous Community" — this last category denotes the language and literature of the regional co-official language (Catalan, Valencian, Basque or Galician), if any. The national Government determines a set of core subjects, while the educational administrations of the autonomous communities may specify additional core subjects and will decide upon the list of non-core subjects.

Admission to the Baccalaureate is subject to a certificate of completion of compulsory secondary education (Graduado en Educación Secundaria Obligatoria), or certain technical qualifications.

First year
In the first year, "general" core subjects (brown background in the table) are taught, together with "optional" core subjects (white background), of which two are chosen in each modality, and specified subjects (green background).

Core subjects

Specialist subjects
Specialist subjects, of which either two or three are to be chosen, depending on provision at the education centre:

 Musical analysis I
 Applied Anatomy
 Scientific Culture
 Artistic Drawing I
 Technical Drawing I
 Music (Practice and Theory)
 Religion
 Second Foreign Language I
 Industrial Technology I
 ICT I
 Volume (sculpture)
 Material from the block of core subjects not taken by the student

Second year

Core subjects
In the second year, "general" core subjects (brown background in the table) are taught, together with "optional" core subjects (white background), of which two are chosen in each modality.

Specialist subjects
Specialist subjects, of which between two and four are to be chosen, depending on provision at the education centre:

 Musical analysis II
 Earth Sciences and Environmental Sciences
 Artistic Drawing II
 Technical Drawing II
 Foundations of Administration and Management
 History of Philosophy
 History of Music and Dance
 Image and Sound
 Psychology
 Religion
 Second Foreign Language II
 Techniques of Graphic-Plastic Expression
 Industrial Technology II
 ICT II
 Material from the block of core subjects not taken by the student

Provision for adults 
Other means of study are especially designed for adults who wish to re-take their studies. These form part of the standard educational provision of some institutes, and are also offered in separate adult education centres.

The "nocturnal" version is provided on a timetable of evening classes. The details may vary according to location, but normally there are four teaching periods of 50 minutes with a 30-minute break in the middle, between 4pm and 10pm. To cater for working adults with less time to study, individual subjects are assessed annually; thus a pass in a subject, once obtained, remains valid in following years. The course content, however, is identical with what is taught at a daytime school.

References 

Academic degrees of Spain